The Hypopyrini are a tribe of moths in the family Erebidae.

Genera

Hexamitoptera
Hypopyra
Spirama

References

 
Erebinae
Moth tribes